The 2023 IIHF World Championship Division II will be an international ice hockey tournament run by the International Ice Hockey Federation.

The Group A tournament will be held in Madrid, Spain from 15 to 21 April and the Group B tournament in Istanbul, Turkey from 17 to 23 April 2023.

Group A tournament

Participants

Standings

Results
All times are local (UTC+2)

Group B tournament

Participants

Standings

Results
All times are local (UTC+3).

References

External links
Official website of Division IIA
Official website of Division IIB

2023
Division II
2023 IIHF World Championship Division II
2023 IIHF World Championship Division II
Sports competitions in Madrid
Sports competitions in Istanbul
2023 in Spanish sport
2023 in Turkish sport
April 2023 sports events in Spain
April 2023 sports events in Turkey
IIHF